Bulanovo is a rural locality (a selo) in Aserkhovskoye Rural Settlement, Sobinsky District, Vladimir Oblast, Russia. The population was 14 as of 2010.

Geography 
Bulanovo is located 20 km east of Sobinka (the district's administrative centre) by road. Meshchera is the nearest rural locality.

References 

Rural localities in Sobinsky District